Mustafa Sayar (born 22 April 1989) is a Turkish professional cyclist, who currently rides for UCI Continental team .  In 2013 he was suspended following his testing positive for EPO.

Career
In 2013, he won the sixth stage of the Tour of Turkey by powering away on the climb to Selçuk in an improbably large gear, leading to disbelief and insinuations from the live TV commentary team and other riders in the race, including Marcel Kittel, who tweeted that he was "not often in my life so angry about a result of someone else". Sayar was the first Turkish rider to provisionally win a stage in the Tour since 2008. With that result, he took the lead in the overall classification. He successfully defended the leader's jersey over the next two stages and won the race.

Doping suspension
On 15 July 2013 he was suspended, following his testing positive for EPO during the Tour d'Algérie in March. As a result, he lost his overall victory in the Tour of Turkey, which went to Natnael Berhane. Sayar retired from the sport in November 2013, but returned to competition after completion of the ban.

Major results

2009
 1st  Road race, National Under-23 Road Championships
 2nd Time trial, National Road Championships
2010
 2nd Overall Tour of Victory
 6th Overall Tour of Trakya
2011
 1st  Overall Tour of Isparta
1st Prologue
 4th Time trial, National Road Championships
 4th Overall Tour of Alanya
 4th Overall Tour of Trakya
 5th Overall Tour of Cappadocia
 5th Overall Tour of Marmara
2012
 2nd Road race, National Road Championships
2013
 1st  Overall Tour of Turkey
1st Stage 6
 2nd Time trial, National Road Championships
 2nd Overall Tour de Blida
1st  Mountains classification
1st  Points classification
1st Stage 1
 2nd Overall Tour d'Algérie
1st  Mountains classification
 5th Circuit d'Alger
 9th Grand Prix of Donetsk
2016
 3rd Time trial, National Road Championships
 3rd Overall Tour of Ankara
1st Stage 3
 4th Overall Tour of Mersin
2018
 2nd Overall Tour of Cappadocia
1st Stage 2
 3rd Overall Tour of Black Sea
 3rd Road race, National Road Championships
 7th Overall Tour of Mesopotamia
2019
 1st Bursa Yıldırım Bayezıt Race
 1st  Mountains classification Tour of Mersin
 National Road Championships
3rd Time trial
4th Road race
 3rd Bursa Orhangazi Race
 4th Overall Tour of Mesopotamia
2022
 3rd Grand Prix Mediterranean
 4th Grand Prix Gündoğmuş
 9th Overall Tour of Turkey

References

External links

1989 births
Living people
Turkish male cyclists
Turkish sportspeople in doping cases
Doping cases in cycling
European Games competitors for Turkey
Cyclists at the 2019 European Games
21st-century Turkish people